Santiago Temple may refer to one of the religious temples in Santiago, Chile:
 The Santiago Bahá'í Temple is the Santiago Baháʼí House of Worship of the South American continent, the last continental House of Worship to be completed.
 Santiago Chile Temple, which is the 26th constructed and 24th operating temple of the Church of Jesus Christ of Latter-day Saints.
Votive Temple of Maipú, a Catholic church located in the Chilean town of Maipú, in the Santiago metro area.

See also :Category:Churches in Santiago, Chile, and the Memorial for the Disappeared.